Carlo De Simone (4 March 1885 – 1951) was an officer in the Italian Army during World War II.

Biography 
During most of the East African Campaign, Lieutenant-General De Simone commanded Italian forces in southern Italian Somaliland. However, during the Italian invasion of British Somaliland, De Simone commanded General Guglielmo Nasi's main "center" column. De Simone's command in Italian Somaliland included the reinforced Harar Division (XIII Colonial Brigade, XIV Colonial Brigade, and XV Colonial Brigade - amounting to eleven infantry battalions, fourteen batteries of artillery, a company of medium tanks (12 tanks), a squadron of light tanks (4 light tanks), and an armored car company (12 armored cars). Whilst in command of these forces, De Simone won the Battle of Tug Argan, where his center column overcame a smaller British army and forced them to evacuate.

Command history
 Commanding Officer, 3rd Bersaglieri Regiment
 Governor of Harar, Italian East Africa - 1936
 Commanding Officer, 2nd Armored Brigade - 1937 to 1939
 General Officer Commanding, 132nd Armored Division Ariete - 1939
 General Officer Commanding, Somaliland Army, East Africa - 1940 to 1941
 Prisoner of war - 1941 to 1944
 General Officer Commanding, VII Territorial Defence Command - 1945
 Prefect of Bologna - 1950

See also
 Second Italo-Abyssinian War
 East African Campaign (World War II)
 Order of Battle, East African Campaign (World War II)

Italian military personnel of World War II
Italian generals
Italian prisoners of war
Governors of British Somaliland
1885 births
1951 deaths